Diogo Alexandre Alves Ferreira (born 5 October 1989) is an Australian footballer who plays as a midfielder.

Early career
At the age of 16, Ferreira completed a successful trial with FC Porto and was signed to the club's youth academy. Whilst in Portugal, he was loaned out to a second division team. At the age of 18, Ferreira thought it was time to return to Australia, and returned to Green Gully, his childhood club. Ferreira was then signed to Melbourne Victory's youth team playing in the National Youth League. He was a key player for two seasons, and was therefore promoted to the club's senior team.

Club career
On 31 March 2010, Ferreira made his senior debut for Melbourne Victory in their 1–0 victory over Kawasaki Frontale in the Asian Champions League.

On 10 May 2010, he was signed to a two-year professional contract with Victory.

On 15 September 2010, Ferreira made his first start for Melbourne Victory against Wellington Phoenix, playing 81 minutes before being substituted for Matthew Foschini.

He scored his first A-League goal on 31 December, playing against Central Coast Mariners. Diogo scored a well placed goal in the 85th minute, in a 2–1 win for Melbourne.

Despite being a regularly used player at Melbourne Victory, Ferreira, along with teammates Tando Velaphi, Spase Dilevski and Sam Gallagher were released by Melbourne Victory in April 2013, shortly after the end of the 2012–13 A-League season. He left the club, having made 52 out of a possible 84 appearances for the club.

Shortly after his release from  the Victory, Ferreira went on trial with rival A-League club Brisbane Roar. Less than two months after his release from the Victory, Ferreira was signed by the Roar on a one-year deal, along with former Sydney FC attacking midfielder Dimitri Petratos.

In May 2014, Ferreira signed with Perth Glory.

In August 2016, Ferreira signed a 4-month deal with Indonesia Soccer Championship side Persib Bandung to bolster the squad after Hermawan left the club for personal reasons.

In January 2017, Ferreira signed a one-season deal with Penang FA.

On 9 August 2017, Ferreira switched clubs and countries and signed for Indian club Mohun Bagan and became their fourth foreign signing of the season. He was released on 16 December, with Ferreira claiming "personal issues" for the action.

International career
Ferreira has represented the Australia Olympic football team on seven occasions, scoring one goal. In addition to his Australian citizenship, Ferreira also has Portuguese citizenship and is eligible to play for Portugal.

Personal life
Ferreira was born in Footscray, Melbourne. Diogo attended St. Bernard's College in Essendon which was also home to Patrick Kisnorbo.

Honours

Club
Perth Glory
FFA Cup: Runners up  2015

References

External links
 Melbourne Victory profile

1989 births
Australian people of Portuguese descent
A-League Men players
Perth Glory FC players
Brisbane Roar FC players
Melbourne Victory FC players
FC Porto players
Tochigi SC players
Soccer players from Melbourne
Living people
Association football midfielders
Australian soccer players
Mohun Bagan AC players
I-League players
Dandenong Football Club players
People from Footscray, Victoria
Australian expatriate sportspeople in Portugal
Australian expatriate sportspeople in India
Australian expatriate sportspeople in Indonesia
Australian expatriate soccer players
Expatriate footballers in India
Expatriate footballers in Indonesia
Expatriate footballers in Portugal